Cintra is an international operator of toll roads and car parks.

Cintra may also refer to:

People

Given name
 Cintra Wilson (21st century), American celebrity writer

Surname
 Adriano Cintra (born 1972), Brazilian multi-instrumentist and producer
 Luís Lindley Cintra (1925-1991), Portuguese linguist
 Sebastião da Silveira Cintra (1882-1942), Brazilian prelate of the Roman Catholic Church
 Sousa Cintra (21st century), Portuguese businessman

Places
 Cintra Bay or the Gulf of Cintra on the coast of Western Sahara.
 Cintra, Portugal, an alternate spelling for Sintra

Other uses
 Cintra (ship), which wrecked on Porthminster Beach in 1893
 Cintra (New Hope, Pennsylvania), a historic house in Bucks County, Pennsylvania, U.S.
 Corporación Internacional de Transporte Aéreo, the former parent company for Aeroméxico, Mexicana de Aviación and Aeroperú

See also
 Cintray, Eure, a commune in France
 Cintray, Eure-et-Loir, a commune in France
 Convention of Cintra, an 1808 treaty between France and the United Kingdom in the first stages of the Peninsula War
 da Cintra, a surname
 Sintra (disambiguation)
 The Elves of Cintra, a novel by Terry Brooks